The 1930–31 Toronto Maple Leafs season was Toronto's 14th season in the National Hockey League (NHL). This was the team's last season in the old Arena Gardens. The Maple Leafs would build Maple Leaf Gardens before the next season.

Offseason

Regular season

Final standings

Record vs. opponents

Schedule and results

Playoffs
The Maple Leafs were defeated by the Chicago Black Hawks in a two-game total goal series,g 4–3.

Player statistics

Regular season
Scoring

Goaltending

Playoffs
Scoring

Goaltending

Awards and records

Transactions

July 30, 1930: Signed Free Agent John Gallagher
October 30, 1930: Acquired King Clancy from the Ottawa Senators for Art Smith, Eric Pettinger, and $35,000
December 4, 1930: Loaned Roger Jenkins from the Chicago Black Hawks
December 8, 1930: Released Babe Dye
December 8, 1930: Signed Free Agent Herb Hamel
December 26, 1930: Loaned Benny Grant to the Boston Tigers of the Can-Am League for cash
February 3, 1931: Returned Roger Jenkins to the Chicago Black Hawks
February 27, 1931: Signed Free Agent Bob Gracie
March 2, 1931: Signed Free Agent Alex Levinsky

See also
1930–31 NHL season

References

Toronto Maple Leafs seasons
Toronto
Toronto